Count  was a Japanese field marshal and leading figure in the early Imperial Japanese Army.

Biography

Early life
Born in Kokura (in present-day Kitakyūshū) to a samurai family of the Kokura Domain in Buzen Province, Oku joined the military forces of the nearby Chōshū Domain during the First and Second Chōshū expeditions and the Boshin War in their struggle to overthrow the Tokugawa shogunate and bring about the Meiji Restoration.

Military career
Appointed a commander of the new Imperial Japanese Army, Oku fought against the disgruntled samurai insurgents during the Saga Rebellion of 1871. He was later a survivor of the Taiwan Expedition of 1874. During the Satsuma Rebellion, he defended Kumamoto Castle during its siege as commander of the 13th Infantry Regiment.

During the First Sino-Japanese War Oku succeeded General Nozu Michitsura commander of the IJA Fifth Division of the IJA First Army. Later, he successively held posts as commander of the Imperial Guards and Governor-general for the defense of Tokyo. He was elevated to the title of danshaku (baron) under the kazoku peerage system in 1895, and was promoted to army general in 1903.

During the Russo-Japanese War, Oku went to the front as commanding general of the IJA 2nd Army and was noted for his role in the Battle of Nanshan, Battle of Shaho, Battle of Mukden, and other campaigns.

Oku was awarded the Order of the Golden Kite (1st class) in 1906, and elevated from baron to hakushaku (count) in 1907. In 1911, he received the largely honorary rank of Field Marshal.

Oku refused to attend strategy and staff meetings, and thereby gained a reputation for being both a "lone wolf" and also a brilliant tactician capable of independent action. However, Oku's reluctance to attend the staff meetings was due to his partial deafness, and inability to comprehend and contribute to the discussions.

Post-war life
Oku had absolutely no interest in politics, and lived in virtual seclusion after the war. When he died of an Intracranial hemorrhage in 1930, many people were astonished, thinking that he had died years previously.

Decorations
 1878 –  Order of the Rising Sun, 4th class 
 1885 –  Order of the Rising Sun, 3rd class 
 1893 –  Order of the Sacred Treasure, 2nd class 
 1895 –  Order of the Rising Sun, 2nd class 
 1895 –  Order of the Golden Kite, 3rd class 
 1900 –  Grand Cordon of the Order of the Sacred Treasure 
 1905 –  Grand Cordon of the Order of the Rising Sun
 1906 –  Order of the Golden Kite, 1st class
 1906 –  Order of the Rising Sun with Paulownia Flowers
 1928 –  Order of the Chrysanthemum

References
 Craig, Albert M. Chōshū in the Meiji Restoration. Cambridge: Harvard University Press, 1961.

External links

Notes

Marshals of Japan
1847 births
1930 deaths
People from Kitakyushu
People of the Boshin War
Kazoku
Japanese military personnel of the First Sino-Japanese War
Japanese military personnel of the Russo-Japanese War
Japanese generals
People of Meiji-period Japan
Recipients of the Order of the Rising Sun with Paulownia Flowers
Grand Cordons of the Order of the Rising Sun
Recipients of the Order of the Sacred Treasure, 1st class
Recipients of the Order of the Golden Kite, 1st class
Grand Officiers of the Légion d'honneur
Recipients of the Virtuti Militari
Recipients of the Military Merit Order (Bavaria)